B-Rock & The Bizz was a hip-hop rap group consisting of producer and rapper/ singer, Baron "B-Rock" Agee, his brother Leevirt Agee from New York City, Paul Costict, and Thaddeus "T-Bird" Maye from Mobile, Alabama. Together, Leevirt Agee and T-Bird Maye were known as The Bizz.

The group is best known for their novelty hip hop and rap hit single, "My Baby Daddy", which peaked at #10 on the Billboard Hot 100 in April 1997. The song was the group's only hit making them a one-hit wonder.

In 1999, Terius "The Dream" Nash replaced T-Bird Maye on the group's second album entitled Porkin' Beans & Wienes.

In 1997, the female Miami bass hip-hop group, Anquette, released an answer song to "My Baby Daddy" entitled "My Baby Mama".

In 2008, Costict was on an episode of Divorce Court, seeking the return of his gold album.

References
Joel Whitburn, The Billboard Book of Top 40 Hits.

American hip hop musicians
Musicians from Alabama